Dead Enz Kidz Doin' Lifetime Bidz is the second and final studio album by American hip hop group Young Black Teenagers. It was released on February 2, 1993 via Sound of Urban Listeners (SOUL)/MCA Records. Production was handled by Gary G-Wiz, Keith Shocklee, Grandmaster Flash, Kerwin "Sleek" Young, Paul Shabazz and Terminator X, with Hank Shocklee serving as executive producer. The album peaked at number 158 on the Billboard 200 in the United States.

Its lead single "Tap the Bottle" peaked at number 55 on the Billboard Hot 100 and number 6 on the Hot Rap Songs, making it the group's biggest hit. The second single, "Roll With the Flavor", made it to #22 on the Hot Rap Singles. The group went on to produce a third album that was never released due to a conflict of interest with Hank Shocklee and their management. They would disband two years later.

Composition
The Bomb Squad's production on this album is noted for its extensive sampling, including prominent  samples of the Rolling Stones' "Monkey Man", Rush's "Tom Sawyer" and Herbie Hancock's "Watermelon Man". Regarding the sampling of Rush's "Tom Sawyer", YBT stated, "it's the phattest shit and it deserves to be rekindled".

Track listing

Personnel 

Adam "Firstborn" Weiner – main artist, songwriter
Ron "Kamron" Winge – main artist, songwriter
Ata – main artist, songwriter (tracks: 3, 4, 7, 8, 10, 13, 14)
Thomas "Tiny" Barbaccia – main artist, songwriter (track 14)
Scott "DJ Skribble" Ialacci – main artist, scratches (track 2)
Flex – songwriter (track 2)
Shorty – songwriter (track 2)
Knowledgable Child – songwriter (track 4)
Sha Sha Devitt – backing vocals (track 13)
Gary "G-Wiz" Rinaldo – producer (tracks: 1, 3, 4, 6-10, 12-14), songwriter (tracks: 3, 4, 6, 8-10, 13, 14)
Keith "Shocklee" Boxley – producer (tracks: 1, 3, 4, 6-10, 12-14), songwriter (tracks: 3, 4, 6, 8, 10, 13, 14)
Norman "Terminator X" Rogers – producer & songwriter (track 2)
Kerwin E. "Sleek" Young – producer & songwriter (track 5)
Paul Shabazz – producer & songwriter (track 5)
Joseph "Grandmaster Flash" Saddler – producer & songwriter (track 11)
Alan Gregorie – engineering, mixing
Nick Sansano – engineering, mixing
John Bradley – engineering, mixing
Gregg Mann – engineering, mixing
Bob Fudjinski – engineering, mixing assistant
Chris Flam – engineer, mixing assistant
Hoover Le – engineering, mixing assistant
Robert Caprio – engineering
Vladimir Meller – mastering
Vic Anesini – mastering
Hank Shocklee – executive producer
Cesar Vera – photography
Herbie Hancock – synthesizer

Chart history

References

External links

1993 albums
MCA Records albums
Young Black Teenagers albums
Albums produced by Grandmaster Flash